Steroidogenic acute regulatory protein is a protein that in humans is encoded by the STAR gene.

Function

The protein encoded by this gene plays a key role in the acute regulation of steroid hormone synthesis by enhancing the conversion of cholesterol into pregnenolone. This protein permits the cleavage of cholesterol into pregnenolone by mediating the transport of cholesterol from the outer mitochondrial membrane to the inner mitochondrial membrane. Mutations in this gene are a cause of congenital lipoid adrenal hyperplasia (CLAH), also called lipoid CAH. A pseudogene of this gene is located on chromosome 13. [provided by RefSeq, Jul 2008].

References

Further reading